Holbeach St Matthew is a small fenland village in the South Holland district of southern Lincolnshire, England.

The hamlet's chapel of ease, dedicated to St Matthew, was built 1868-69 by Ewan Christian in Early English style, and was capable of holding 110 persons. It is constructed of brick, has a combined nave and chancel, a south porch, and an east of nave turret with bell. The chapel, now redundant, has been converted to residential use.

References

External links

 Holbeach, Genuki. Retrieved 26 October 2011

Villages in Lincolnshire
Holbeach